British Black music refers to music of the African diaspora, or music derived from the African diaspora which has been produced in Great Britain regardless of the ethnic background of the musicians.

Awards
Since 1996, an annual awards ceremony has been held for Music Of Black Origin, also known as the MOBO awards.

Genres
 2-step garage
 Afroswing
 Bassline
 Britfunk
 British black gospel
 British blues
 British hip hop
 British jazz
 British reggae
 British soul
 Dubstep
 Grime
 Lovers rock  
 Jungle
 Ragga jungle
 Trip hop
 UK garage
 UK funky
 UK gospel
 UK drill
 Progressive rap

Organisations and events
 African Society of Literati, Musicians, and Artists (established in 1897)
 Music Of Black Origin Awards
 Urban Music Seminar
 Black Music Awards (BMA)

Notable contributors to British black music

16th century
 John Blanke

18th century
 Ignatius Sancho
 George Bridgetower
 Joseph Emidy
 Fisk Jubilee Singers

20th century
 Samuel Coleridge-Taylor
 Southern Syncopated Orchestra
 Ken "Snakehips" Johnson
 Aswad
 Loose Ends (band)
 Junior Giscombe
 Maxi Priest
 Five Star 
 Heatwave (band)
 Imagination
 Sade
 Soul II Soul
 Mica Paris
 Gabrielle
 Shola Ama
 D'Influence
 Beverley Knight
 The Specials
 Amazulu (band)
 Omar
 Lynden David Hall
 Skin (Skunk Anansie)
 A Guy Called Gerald
 Cleopatra
 Sonique

Early 21st century
 Wiley
 So Solid Crew
 Dizzee Rascal
 Ghetts
 Jammer
 Lethal Bizzle
 Skepta
 Kano
 Stormzy
 FKA Twigs
 Sampha
 Michael Kiwanuka
 Little Simz
 Raleigh Ritchie
 Lady Leshurr
 Dave 
 Wretch 32
 Krept & Konan
 Central Cee
 AJ Tracey
 Tinie Tempah
 J Hus
 JME
 Leigh-Anne Pinnock
 Arlo Parks
 Shaznay Lewis
 MNEK
 Labrinth
 Rizzle Kicks
 Ms Banks
 Jorja Smith
 Kele Okereke

See also
 Black British
 Caribbean music in the United Kingdom
 Music of Africa
 British Black Gospel

References

Further reading
 
  
 
 
 
 
 
 
 
 
 

 
British styles of music
Music of the African diaspora